Knemidokoptes is a genus of parasitic mites in the family Epidermoptidae that infect the skin or feather follicles of birds, especially gallinaceous birds (chickens, pheasants, and relatives) as well as parakeets and canaries. Infection commonly causes scaly lesions to form at the face or feet, which is known as knemidocoptiasis.

It was formerly placed in the family  Knemidokoptidae, which is now treated as a subfamily with 15 species grouped in six genera.

Species
Knemidokoptes mutans - also known as the scaly leg mite
Knemidokoptes pilae - scaly face mite

References

Sarcoptiformes
Parasites of birds